Miklós Zágon (born 1920, date of death unknown) was a Hungarian rower. He competed at the 1948 Summer Olympics and the 1952 Summer Olympics.

References

1920 births
Year of death missing
Hungarian male rowers
Olympic rowers of Hungary
Rowers at the 1948 Summer Olympics
Rowers at the 1952 Summer Olympics
Rowers from Budapest